An annular solar eclipse will occur on Saturday, July 13, 2075. A solar eclipse occurs when the Moon passes between Earth and the Sun, thereby totally or partly obscuring the image of the Sun for a viewer on Earth. An annular solar eclipse occurs when the Moon's apparent diameter is smaller than the Sun's, blocking most of the Sun's light and causing the Sun to look like an annulus (ring). An annular eclipse appears as a partial eclipse over a region of the Earth thousands of kilometers wide.

An annular eclipse will cross Europe and Russia. Eight European capitals will observe annual eclipse: Monaco, San Marino, Ljubljana, Zagreb, Vienna, Bratislava, Budapest and Moscow. For Moscow it will be the first central eclipse since 1887. Other European large cities (non-capitals), in which the annular eclipse will seen, include Barcelona, Marseille, Genoa, Graz, Kraków, Lviv, Nizhny Novgorod, Kirov.

Related eclipses

Solar eclipses 2073–2076

Saros 147

Inex series

Metonic series 
 All eclipses in this table occur at the Moon's ascending node.

References

External links 

2075 7 13
2075 in science
2075 7 13
2075 7 13